Candiru phlebovirus (CDUV) is a species of virus in the genus Phlebovirus.

Related strains
CDUV forms a serocomplex of related viruses with other phlebovirus strains (not italicized) and species (italicized), including:
 Alenquer phlebovirus
 Ariquemes virus
 Echarate phlebovirus
 Itaituba phlebovirus
 Jacunda virus
 Maldonado phlebovirus
 Morumbi virus
 Mucura virus
 Nique phlebovirus
 Oriximina phlebovirus
 Serra Norte virus
 Turuna phlebovirus

The serocomplex, CDUV, Alenquer, Echarate, Maldonado, Morumbi, and Serra Norte were isolated from people experiencing febrile illness, whereas the others were isolated from mosquitoes and sandflies.

References

Phleboviruses